Rhaphium is a genus of flies in the family Dolichopodidae. It is the largest genus within the subfamily Rhaphiinae, with over 200 species currently known.

Gallery

Species

 Rhaphium aequale Van Duzee, 1927
 Rhaphium albibarbum (Van Duzee, 1924)
 Rhaphium albifrons Zetterstedt, 1843
 Rhaphium albomaculatum (Becker, 1891)
 Rhaphium aldrichi (Van Duzee, 1922)
 Rhaphium antennatum (Carlier, 1835)
 Rhaphium apicinigrum Yang & Saigusa, 1999
 Rhaphium apophysatum Tang, Wang & Yang, 2016
 Rhaphium appendiculatum Zetterstedt, 1849
 Rhaphium arboreum Curran, 1924
 Rhaphium armatum Curran, 1924
 Rhaphium atkinsoni Curran, 1926
 Rhaphium auctum Loew, 1857
 Rhaphium baihuashanum Yang, 1998
 Rhaphium banksi Van Duzee, 1926
 Rhaphium barbipes (Van Duzee, 1923)
 Rhaphium basale Loew, 1850
 Rhaphium beringiense Negrobov & Vockeroth, 1979
 Rhaphium bidilatatum (Parent, 1954)
 Rhaphium bilobum Tang, Wang & Yang, 2016
 Rhaphium bisectum Tang, Wang & Yang, 2016
 Rhaphium boreale (Van Duzee, 1923)
 Rhaphium borisovi Negrobov, Barkalov & Selivanova, 2012
 Rhaphium brachycerus Meuffels & Grootaert, 1999
 Rhaphium brevicorne Curtis, 1835
 Rhaphium brevilamellatum Van Duzee in Curran, 1926
 Rhaphium brooksi Negrobov, Barkalov & Selivanova, 2011
 Rhaphium browni Curran, 1931
 Rhaphium bukzeevae Grichanov, 1995
 Rhaphium bulyginskayae Grichanov, 1995
 Rhaphium calcaratum Van Duzee, 1928
 Rhaphium caliginosum Meigen, 1824
 Rhaphium campestre Curran, 1924
 Rhaphium canadense Curran, 1924
 Rhaphium canniccii Grootaert, Taylor & Guenard, 2019
 Rhaphium caucasicum Negrobov, Grichanov & Selivanova, 2013
 Rhaphium caudatum Van Duzee in Curran, 1926
 Rhaphium ciliatum Curran, 1929
 Rhaphium coloradense Curran, 1926
 Rhaphium colute Harmston & James, 1942
 Rhaphium commune (Meigen, 1824)
 Rhaphium confine Zetterstedt, 1843
 Rhaphium crassipes (Meigen, 1824)
 Rhaphium crinitum Negrobov & Onishchenko, 1991
 Rhaphium cupreum Macquart, 1827
 Rhaphium currani (Parent, 1939)
 Rhaphium curvitarsus Negrobov, Maslova & Selivanova, 2020
 Rhaphium daqinggouense Tang, Wang & Yang, 2016
 Rhaphium dichromum Negrobov, 1976
 Rhaphium dilatatum Wiedemann, 1830
 Rhaphium discigerum Stenhammar, 1850
 Rhaphium discolor Zetterstedt, 1838
 Rhaphium dispar Coquillett, 1898
 Rhaphium doroninae Grichanov, 1995
 Rhaphium doroteum Negrobov, 1979
 Rhaphium dorsiseta Tang, Wang & Yang, 2016
 Rhaphium dubium (Van Duzee, 1922)
 Rhaphium eburnea (Parent, 1926)
 Rhaphium effilatum (Wheeler, 1899)
 Rhaphium elegantulum (Meigen, 1824)
 Rhaphium elongatum Van Duzee, 1933
 Rhaphium ensicorne Meigen, 1824
 Rhaphium essoense Negrobov, 1979
 Rhaphium exile Curran, 1926
 Rhaphium fasciatum Meigen, 1824
 Rhaphium fascipes (Meigen, 1824)
 Rhaphium femineum (Van Duzee, 1922)
 Rhaphium femoratum (Van Duzee, 1922)
 Rhaphium firsovi Stackelberg & Negrobov in Negrobov, 1976
 Rhaphium fissum Loew, 1850
 Rhaphium flavicoxa (Van Duzee, 1922)
 Rhaphium flavilabre Negrobov, 1979
 Rhaphium foliatum Curran, 1926
 Rhaphium fulvipes (Macquart, 1827)
 Rhaphium furcatum Yang & Saigusa, 2000
 Rhaphium furciferum Curran, 1931
 Rhaphium gangchanum Qilemoge, Wang & Yang, 2019
 Rhaphium gansuanum Yang, 1998
 Rhaphium gibsoni Curran, 1926
 Rhaphium glaciale (Ringdahl, 1920)
 Rhaphium gracile Curran, 1924
 Rhaphium grandicercum Negrobov, 1979
 Rhaphium grande (Curran, 1923)
 Rhaphium gravipes Haliday in Walker, Stainton & Wilkinson, 1851
 Rhaphium gruniniani Negrobov, 1979
 Rhaphium gussakovskii Stackelberg & Negrobov in Negrobov, 1976
 Rhaphium heilongjiangense Wang, Yang & Masunaga, 2005
 Rhaphium hirtimanum Van Duzee, 1933
 Rhaphium holmgreni (Mik, 1878)
 Rhaphium hongkongense Grootaert, Taylor & Guenard, 2019
 Rhaphium hungaricum (Becker, 1918)
 Rhaphium huzhuense Qilemoge, Lin, Qi, Li & Yang, 2020 
 Rhaphium impetuum Curran, 1926
 Rhaphium insolitum Curran, 1926
 Rhaphium intermedium (Becker, 1918)
 Rhaphium jamalense Negrobov, 1986
 Rhaphium johnrichardi Negrobov & Grichanov, 2010
 Rhaphium johnsoni (Van Duzee, 1923)
 Rhaphium lanceolatum Loew, 1850
 Rhaphium latifacies Van Duzee, 1930
 Rhaphium latimanum Kahanpaa, 2007
 Rhaphium lehri Negrobov, 1977
 Rhaphium longibara Van Duzee, 1930
 Rhaphium longicorne (Fallen, 1823)
 Rhaphium longipalpe Curran, 1926
 Rhaphium longipes (Loew, 1864)
 Rhaphium lugubre Loew, 1861
 Rhaphium lumbricum Wei, 2006
 Rhaphium macalpini Negrobov, 1986
 Rhaphium macrocerum Meigen, 1824
 Rhaphium maculipes (Meigen, 1824)
 Rhaphium magnicorne (Zetterstedt, 1843)
 Rhaphium mcveighi Grichanov, 1995
 Rhaphium mediocre (Becker, 1922)
 Rhaphium melampus (Loew, 1861)
 Rhaphium mesasiaticum Negrobov, Selivanova & Maslova, 2013
 Rhaphium micans (Meigen, 1824)
 Rhaphium minhense Qilemoge, Lin, Qi, Li & Yang, 2020
 Rhaphium monotrichum Loew, 1850
 Rhaphium montanum (Van Duzee, 1920)
 Rhaphium nasutum (Fallen, 1823)
 Rhaphium neimengense Tang, Wang & Yang, 2016
 Rhaphium neolatifacies Yang & Wang, 2006
 Rhaphium nigrum (Van Duzee, 1923)
 Rhaphium nigribarbatum (Becker, 1900)
 Rhaphium nigricoxa (Loew, 1861)
 Rhaphium nigrociliatum Curran, 1926
 Rhaphium nigrovittatum Curran, 1926
 Rhaphium nubilum Van Duzee, 1930
 Rhaphium nudiusculum Negrobov, 1976
 Rhaphium nuortevai Negrobov, 1977
 Rhaphium obscuripes Zetterstedt, 1849
 Rhaphium obtusum Van Duzee, 1928
 Rhaphium occipitale Curran, 1927
 Rhaphium orientale Curran, 1926
 Rhaphium ovsyannikovae Grichanov, 1995
 Rhaphium palliaristatum Yang & Saigusa, 2001
 Rhaphium palpale Curran, 1926
 Rhaphium parentianum Negrobov, 1979
 Rhaphium patellitarse (Becker, 1900)
 Rhaphium patulum (Raddatz, 1873)
 Rhaphium paulseni Philippi, 1865
 Rhaphium pectinatum (Loew, 1859)
 Rhaphium pectinigerum (Parent, 1938)
 Rhaphium penicillatum Loew, 1850
 Rhaphium petchi Curran, 1924
 Rhaphium picketti Grichanov, 1995
 Rhaphium pitkini Grichanov, 1995
 Rhaphium pollex (Van Duzee, 1922)
 Rhaphium psilopodum (Becker, 1918)
 Rhaphium punctitarse Curran, 1924
 Rhaphium qinghaiense Yang, 1998
 Rhaphium quadrispinosum (Strobl, 1898)
 Rhaphium reaveyi Grichanov, 1995
 Rhaphium relatum (Becker, 1922)
 Rhaphium rhaphioides Zetterstedt, 1838
 Rhaphium richterae Negrobov, 1977
 Rhaphium riparium (Meigen, 1824)
 Rhaphium rivale (Loew, 1869)
 Rhaphium robustum Curran, 1926
 Rhaphium rossi Harmston & Knowlton, 1940
 Rhaphium rotundiceps (Loew, 1861)
 Rhaphium sachalinense Negrobov, 1979
 Rhaphium septentrionale Curran, 1931
 Rhaphium sexsetosum (Vanschuytbroeck, 1951)
 Rhaphium shaliuhense Qilemoge, Wang & Yang, 2019
 Rhaphium shamshevi Grichanov, 1995
 Rhaphium shannoni Curran, 1926
 Rhaphium sibiricum Negrobov, Barkalov & Selivanova, 2011
 Rhaphium sichotense Negrobov, 1979
 Rhaphium sichuanense Yang & Saigusa, 1999
 Rhaphium signifer (Osten Sacken, 1878)
 Rhaphium simplicipes Curran, 1926
 Rhaphium sinense Negrobov, 1979
 Rhaphium speciosum (S. Abreu, 1929)
 Rhaphium spinitarse Curran, 1924
 Rhaphium spinulatum Grootaert, Taylor & Guenard, 2019
 Rhaphium srilankense Naglis & Grootaert, 2011
 Rhaphium stackelbergi Negrobov, 1976
 Rhaphium steyskali Robinson, 1967
 Rhaphium suave (Loew, 1859)
 Rhaphium subarmatum Curran, 1924
 Rhaphium subfurcatum Van Duzee, 1932
 Rhaphium subtridactylum Negrobov, Barkalov & Selivanova, 2011
 Rhaphium temerarium (Becker, 1922)
 Rhaphium terminale (Van Duzee, 1924)
 Rhaphium thoracicum (Meigen, 1824)
 Rhaphium tianshanicum Negrobov, Grichanov & Selivanova, 2013
 Rhaphium tianshuiense Qilemoge, Wang & Yang, 2019
 Rhaphium tibiale (von Roser, 1840)
 Rhaphium triangulatum (Van Duzee, 1922)
 Rhaphium tricaudatum (Van Duzee, 1923)
 Rhaphium tridactylum (Frey, 1915)
 Rhaphium tripartitum (Frey, 1913)
 Rhaphium tuberculatum (Negrobov, 1973)
 Rhaphium turanicola (Stackelberg, 1927)
 Rhaphium umbripenne (Frey, 1915)
 Rhaphium vanduzeei Curran, 1926
 Rhaphium venustum Negrobov, 1977
 Rhaphium vockerothi Robinson, 1964
 Rhaphium wheeleri Van Duzee, 1932
 Rhaphium wuduanum Wang, Yang & Masunaga, 2005
 Rhaphium xinjiangense Yang, 1998
 Rhaphium xipheres (Wheeler, 1899)
 Rhaphium xiphias Meigen, 1824
 Rhaphium zairense Negrobov, Grichanov & Bakary, 1982
 Rhaphium zakonnikovae Grichanov, 1995
 Rhaphium zhongdianum Yang & Saigusa, 2001

References

Europe
Nearctic

Dolichopodidae genera
Rhaphiinae
Articles containing video clips
Asilomorph flies of Europe
Diptera of North America
Taxa named by Johann Wilhelm Meigen